Thomas Seaton Forman (1791 – 30 December 1850) was a British Conservative politician.

Forman was the son of William Forman (baptised 1767 and died in 1829), and Mary née Seaton.

Encouraged by his involvement in his family's iron trade, Forman was elected Conservative Member of Parliament (MP) for Bridgwater at the 1841 general election and held the seat until 1847 when he did not seek re-election.

Over the years, he used his inherited wealth to indulge in collecting antiques and objets d'art, before his death in 1850 in Pisa, Italy. He left behind a widow, Elizabeth née Moore, but no children, with the majority of the family wealth being passed to his unmarried brother, William Henry Forman.

In 1849, Forman purchased Pippbrook House in Dorking, Surrey. When he died (just over a year later), the property was inherited by his brother, William Henry Forman.

References

External links
 

UK MPs 1841–1847
Conservative Party (UK) MPs for English constituencies
1791 births
1850 deaths